Robert Emmet King (1848 – November 11, 1921) was mayor of Louisville, Kentucky for 17 days in 1896. He was an undertaker, and elected to the Board of Aldermen in 1894. He served as president of that body from 1895 to 1897, except during his brief term as mayor. He was appointed the mayor pro tem after Henry S. Tyler died in office. King was thus the first Republican mayor of the city.

He retired to Indiana farm after his public career ended. He was buried in Cave Hill Cemetery.

Further reading

References

1848 births
1921 deaths
Mayors of Louisville, Kentucky
Burials at Cave Hill Cemetery